Andre Pool (born November 23, 1961) is a member of the National Assembly of Seychelles. A teacher by profession, he is a member of the Seychelles People's Progressive Front, and has been elected to the Assembly four times.

References
Member page on Assembly website

Living people
Members of the National Assembly (Seychelles)
People from Anse Boileau
United Seychelles Party politicians
1961 births